Full Force is a 1980 album by the Art Ensemble of Chicago, their second to appear on the ECM label.

Reception
The album was identified by Chris Kelsey in his Allmusic essay "Free Jazz: A Subjective History" as one of the 20 Essential Free Jazz Albums.

The Allmusic review by Michael G. Nastos states "Their music in this era continued in a developmental phase, stripping away nuance and shadings in lieu of pure expressionism, even more experimental while utilizing thematic ideas that alternately suggest world music fusions and tune structures. This may be the most accessible Art Ensemble of Chicago album, perhaps disappointing for some hardcore fans, but certainly illuminating to many others unexposed to their unmitigated brilliance".

Track listing
 "Magg Zelma" (Malachi Favors) - 19:50
 "Care Free" (Roscoe Mitchell) 0:50
 "Charlie M" (Lester Bowie) - 9:18
 "Old Time Southside Street Dance" (Joseph Jarman) - 5:12
 "Full Force" (Art Ensemble of Chicago) - 7:24

Personnel
 Lester Bowie – trumpet, celeste, bass drum
 Malachi Favors – double bass, percussion, melodica
 Joseph Jarman – saxophone, clarinet, percussion, vocal
 Roscoe Mitchell – saxophone, clarinet, flute, percussion
 Don Moye – drums, percussion, vocal

References

1980 albums
ECM Records albums
Art Ensemble of Chicago albums
Albums produced by Manfred Eicher